Sing is the third solo studio album released by British singer-songwriter Gary Barlow. The album was released through Decca Records on 25 May 2012 and features The Commonwealth Band which was created by Barlow to commemorate the Diamond Jubilee of Elizabeth II.

Background 
With Take That on hiatus after the completion of their record breaking Progress Live tour in 2011, Barlow was approached by the Queen's advisers to discuss his writing of a song which would become the official single of the Diamond Jubilee. Barlow then begun to shape ideas before enlisting the help of Andrew Lloyd Webber who was also asked to create a piece of music for the celebrations.

Release 
Once the title track, "Sing", was written, Barlow then re-recorded his version of "Here Comes the Sun" by The Beatles, which was used previously in a UK advertising campaign for Marks & Spencer, and added it to the release. Further to this he then worked with other singers and recorded new versions of older songs which were also included.

Chart performance 
The album entered the UK Albums Chart at number 1 with sales of 40,020, becoming Barlow's second number 1 album since Open Road which was released in May 1997. The album now holds the record for the shortest playing number one album in chart history. The album also reached number 1 on the Scottish Albums Chart and number 61 in Ireland. The album remained at number 1 in the UK Albums Chart the following week, selling 75,538 copies—the third highest weekly sale by any artist album in 2012, and the highest for 16 weeks. "Sing" also rose from 11 to number 1, making Barlow the first artist in 2012 to be number 1 on the album and singles chart in the same week. Upon the announcement of the album entering at number 1, Barlow said "I couldn't have wished for anything more on this momentous weekend!" in reference to the Diamond Jubilee celebrations. Lord Andrew Lloyd Webber, co-writer of lead single "Sing", added: "I'm absolutely thrilled, this is a burst of sunshine on a rainy Sunday".

Track listing

Charts

Weekly charts

Year-end charts

Certifications

Release history

References

2012 albums
Gary Barlow albums
Baroque pop albums
Sunshine pop albums
Diamond Jubilee of Elizabeth II